Stenungsunds IF is a Swedish football club located in Stenungsund.

Background
Stenungsunds IF currently plays in Division 2 Norra Götaland which is the fourth tier of Swedish football. They play their home matches at the Nösnäsvallen in Stenungsund. The club is affiliated to Bohusläns Fotbollförbund. 

Stenungsunds IF have competed in the Svenska Cupen on 25 occasions and have played 67 matches in the competition. Their latest occasion was in 2020–21 and their best performance was in 1997–98 were they managed to get to the quarter-finals before getting knocked out by Helsingborgs IF.

Season-to-season

References

External links
 Stenungsunds IF – Official website
 Stenungsunds IF – Official Facebook page

Football clubs in Västra Götaland County
Association football clubs established in 1927
1927 establishments in Sweden